Niederburg may refer to:

 Niederburg, a municipality in Rhineland-Palatinate, Germany
 Niederburg, part of the old town of Konstanz, Germany
 Niederburg (boat, 1960), an old passenger ferry at Konstanz, Germany

Niederburg may also refer to the following castles in Germany:

 Niederburg, the German castle term for an outer ward that is lower than its associated inner ward
 Niederburg, Büren, a ruined castle in Büren, Westphalia
 Niederburg, Kobern, a ruined castle in Kobern, Rhineland-Palatinate
 Niederburg, Kranichfeld, a castle in Kranichfeld, Thuringia
 Niederburg Castle, a ruined castle in the municipality of Niederburg, Rhineland-Palatinate
 Niederburg, one of the two castles of Manderscheid
 Brömserburg (AKA Niederburg) in Rüdesheim am Rhein, Hesse
 Schloss Liebieg in Gondorf, Rhineland-Palatinate